Gerardus Johannes Paulus "Gertjan" Tamerus (born 11 October 1980) is a Duch former footballer who played as a forward or attacking midfielder. He is the current manager of Dutch Tweede Divisie side Koninklijke HFC.

Tamerus was born in Haarlem and made his debut in professional football for HFC Haarlem in the 1999–2000 season. He also played for Heracles Almelo, NAC Breda, AO Trikala, SVZW and Ter Leede.

Honours
Heracles Almelo
 Eerste Divisie: 2004–05

References

1980 births
Living people
Dutch footballers
Association football forwards
Eredivisie players
Eerste Divisie players
Tweede Divisie players
Derde Divisie players
HFC Haarlem players
Heracles Almelo players
NAC Breda players
Trikala F.C. players
Dutch expatriate footballers
Expatriate footballers in Greece
Dutch expatriate sportspeople in Greece
Footballers from Haarlem
Ter Leede players